Edwin Hallowell (April 2, 1844 – September 13, 1916) was a Democratic member of the U.S. House of Representatives from Pennsylvania.

Biography
Edwin Hallowell was born near Willow Grove, Pennsylvania.  He attended the public schools.  He engaged in agricultural pursuits, and was elected as a member of the Pennsylvania State House of Representatives, serving from 1876 to 1879.  He was chairman of the Democratic county committee of Montgomery County, Pennsylvania, in 1886.  He was a delegate to the 1888 Democratic National Convention.

Hallowell was elected as a Democrat to the Fifty-second Congress.  He was a delegate to the Democratic Presidential Convention that nominated Grover Cleveland for president, second term. He was an unsuccessful candidate for reelection in 1892.  Owing to his physical disabilities Hallowell led a private life for the last years of his life. He was a bachelor and made his home with his sister on the farm on Plank Road in Abington Township. He resumed agricultural pursuits, and died in Abington, Pennsylvania. Interment in Abington Friends Burying Ground in Jenkintown, Pennsylvania.

Notes

References

 Retrieved on 2008-02-14
The Political Graveyard

External links

1844 births
1916 deaths
Hallowell family
Democratic Party members of the United States House of Representatives from Pennsylvania
19th-century American politicians